Arnold Lodge is a medium secure psychiatric hospital situated in Leicester, England, run by Nottinghamshire Healthcare NHS Foundation Trust.

History

The hospital was opened in July 1983 and an extension with 30 extra beds was opened in 2007.

Services
Arnold Lodge receives referrals from courts, prisons, the probation service, social services, high secure hospitals, and other mental health units for forensic psychiatry assessment and/or treatment. The patients are mainly mentally disordered offenders or others with similar needs.

There are seven wards: two male rehabilitation wards (Thornton and Foxton wards), one male acute/admission ward (Rutland ward), two male personality disorder wards (Cannock and Ridgeway wards), and two female wards (Tamar and Coniston). Coniston ward is for women who require an enhanced level of care within medium security. This service will be one of three national pilots for a model of service known as WEMSS (Women’s Enhanced Medium Secure Services).

References

External links
Arnold Lodge on Nottinghamshire Healthcare website

Hospital buildings completed in 1983
Psychiatric hospitals in England
NHS hospitals in England
Leicester
Hospitals in Leicestershire
1983 establishments in England
Hospitals established in 1983